Annuliconchus is a genus of microconchid tubeworms. 
Their tubes have pseudopunctae penetrating the tube wall. Tubes lumen is annulated. Annuliconchus occurs in the Silurian of Baltica.

References

Protostome enigmatic taxa
Tentaculita
Silurian animals
Prehistoric life of Europe